The Oldtimer Museum Rügen (formerly the Rügen Railway and Technology Museum—Eisenbahn & Technik Museum Rügen or ETM) is a German railway museum based on the Baltic Sea island resort of Rügen in the state of Mecklenburg-Western Pomerania, Germany. It was established in 1994 and is housed in the museum section of the Nazi-built  Kraft durch Freude ('strength through joy') building complex at Prora which is a protected monument.

In the vicinity of the station, in a 4000 m² hall and in the open air, the following may be visited:

Locomotives and other exhibits, especially those of the Deutsche Reichsbahn, but also other railway administrations:
DRG Class 03 – no. 03 193 with streamlining made at the Reichsbahnausbesserungswerk Meiningen. The locomotive is now displayed with running number 03 002
DR Class 23.10 – no. 23 1021 (later 35 1021-1)
DRG Class 44 – no. 44 397 (later 44 0397-8 when oil-fired, 44 2397-6 when coal-fired)
DR Class 50.35-37 – no. 50 3703 (rebuilt from 50 877)
DR Class 52.80 – no. 52 8190-2 (rebuilt from 52 2887)
ÖBB Class 1018 – no. 1018.04 as E18 208
SDZ class P36 - Soviet steam locomotive P36-123
Culemeyer heavy trailer with a Kaelble tractor
 Steam-driven rotary snow plough
Cars (not just East German makes)
Lorries
Fire engines, e.g. by  Magirus Deutz and IFA
Tractors

See also 
 List of preserved steam locomotives in Germany
 Rügensche Kleinbahn

External links 
 Official website of the Railway and Technology Museum
 Tram Travels: Oldtimer Museum Rügen

Railway museums in Germany
Transport in Mecklenburg-Western Pomerania
History of Mecklenburg-Western Pomerania
Museums in Mecklenburg-Western Pomerania
Rügen
Binz